Ternengo is a comune (municipality) in the Province of Biella in the Italian region Piedmont, located about  northeast of Turin and about  southeast of Biella.

Ternengo borders the following municipalities: Bioglio, Pettinengo, Piatto, Ronco Biellese, Valdengo.

Demographic evolution

References

Cities and towns in Piedmont